Brian Bevan (born 20 March 1937) is an English former professional footballer who played as a left winger in the Football League. He was born in Bristol.

References

External links

1937 births
Living people
English footballers
Association football midfielders
Bridgwater Town F.C. players
Bristol City F.C. players
Carlisle United F.C. players
Millwall F.C. players
Weymouth F.C. players
English Football League players
Footballers from Bristol